The 1963 Houston Oilers season was the fourth season for the Houston Oilers as a professional American football franchise. Houston had won the first two league championships and were runners-up in 1962, which went to a second overtime. In 1963, the Oilers lost their final four games to finish at 6–8, 1½ games behind the Boston Patriots and Buffalo Bills in the Eastern division. They failed to win the division (and qualify for the title game) for the first time in franchise history.

Season schedule

Standings

Season summary

Week 1 vs Raiders

References 

Houston Oilers seasons
Houston Oilers
Houston